First Baptist Wheaton is an evangelical Christian church located in Wheaton, Illinois, situated in southern DuPage County, and is not formally related to any denomination or baptist association.  The church was founded in 1864 by 20 pioneers around the time Abraham Lincoln was drafting his Gettysburg Address.  Weekly church attendance averages nearly 600. In July 2018, the church merged with Highpoint Church and is now known as Highpoint Church-Wheaton Campus.

References

Baptist churches in Illinois
Buildings and structures in Wheaton, Illinois
Religious organizations established in 1864
1864 establishments in Illinois
Churches in DuPage County, Illinois